Beef Head Creek is a stream in Liberty County, Texas, in the United States.

Beef Head Creek was so named for the fact it was a favorite watering spot of cattlemen.

See also
List of rivers of Texas

References

Rivers of Liberty County, Texas
Rivers of Texas